= List of botanical gardens in Uzbekistan =

Botanical gardens in Uzbekistan have collections consisting entirely of Uzbekistan's native and endemic species; most have a collection that include plants from around the world. There are botanical gardens and arboreta in all states and territories of Uzbekistan, most are administered by local governments, some are privately owned.

- Botanical Garden of the Academy of Sciences of the Republic of Uzbekistan, Tashkent
- Botanical Garden named after Amir Temur, Buston, Karakalpakstan
- Tashkent Botanical Garden, with a territory of almost 70 hectares, is the largest and oldest botanical garden in Central Asian region.
